This is a list of Pakistani film directors.

A 
 Adnan Sarwar
 Afia Nathaniel
 Ahmad Bashir
 Ajab Gul
 Alizeh Imtiaz
 Ammar Aziz
 Anjum Shahzad
 Anwar Kamal Pasha
 Asim Raza
 Azfar Jafri
 Aziz Jindani

B 
 Badar Munir
 Bilal Lashari

D

F 
 Farjad Nabi

H 
 Haissam Hussain
 Haseeb Hassan
 Hassan Rana
 Hassan Tariq

I 
 Ilyas Kashmiri
 Imtiaz Dharker
 Ismail Jilani

J 
 Jamshed Jan Mohammad
 Jan Mohammad
 Jarrar Rizvi
 Javed Jabbar
 Javed Raza
 Javed Sheikh
 Jawad Ahmad

K 
 Khalil-ur-Rehman Qamar
 Khalique Ibrahim Khalique
 Khawaja Khurshid Anwar

M 
 M. Akram
 Maheen Zia
 Mehreen Jabbar
 Mohammad Ali
 Mohammed Ehteshamuddin
 Momina Duraid
 Mubashir Lucman
 Mushtaq Gazdar
 Mustafa Qureshi

N 
 Nabeel Qureshi
Nadeem Cheema
 Nadeem Baig
 Nannha
 Nazir Ahmed Khan
 Noor Jehan
 Nazar-ul-Islam

P 
 Pervaiz Kaleem
 Pervez Malik

R 
 Rahim Gul
 Rangeela
 Rauf Khalid
 Reema Khan
 Riaz Shahid

S 
 Sabiha Sumar
 Saeed Khan Rangeela
 Saeed Rizvi
 Sajjad Ali
 Sajjad Gul
 Salma Mumtaz
 Samar Minallah
 Samina Peerzada
 Sangeeta
 Saqib Mausoof
 Sarmad Khoosat
 Shaan Shahid
 Shah Asad
 Shahzad Kashmiri
 Shamim Ara
 Sharmeen Obaid-Chinoy
 Shaukat Hussain Rizvi
 Shehzad Afzal
 Shehzad Rafiq
 Shoaib Mansoor
 Sudhir
 Syed Faisal Bukhari
 Syed Kamal
 Syed Noor

U 
 Umer Sharif
 Usman Peerzada
 Uzair Zaheer Khan

W 
 W.Z. Ahmed
 Waheed Murad

Y 
 Yasir Jaswal
 Yasir Nawaz

Z 
 Zarqa Nawaz

See also 
 List of Pakistani television and theatre directors

References

Pakistani
Film directors
Directors